Rachel India True (born November 15, 1966) is an American actress. She is best known for her roles in such films as The Craft (1996), Nowhere (1997), and Half Baked (1998). True is also known for her role as Mona Thorne on the UPN sitcom Half & Half,  which ran from 2002 to 2006.

Early life 
True was born in New York City, the middle of three children. Her father is of Ashkenazi Jewish descent, whereas her mother is of African American heritage. Her younger sister, Noel, is also an actress. True attended New York University.

Career 
True made her television debut in 1991 on the episode "Theo's Final Final" of NBC sitcom The Cosby Show. In 1993, she moved to Los Angeles and made her feature film debut playing Chris Rock's character's girlfriend in the comedy CB4. On television, she appeared in episodes of Hangin' with Mr. Cooper, Beverly Hills, 90210, Getting By, The Fresh Prince of Bel-Air, Family Matters, Dream On and well as made-for-television movies Moment of Truth: Stalking Back (1993) and A Walton Wedding (1995). In 1995, she had supporting role in the erotic horror film Embrace of the Vampire starring Alyssa Milano.

In 1996, True landed her breakthrough role as Rochelle Zimmerman in the supernatural horror film, The Craft, where she played a member of a teenage coven. True stated that she had to "fight" to audition for the part and was actively going up against her future co-stars Fairuza Balk, Neve Campbell and Robin Tunney. Her role was originally written for a white actress, but that didn't deter her from auditioning. In 1997, she starred in the comedy-drama film, Nowhere alongside James Duval, the film received mixed reviews from critics. The following year, True starred as Dave Chappelle's romantic interest in the comedy film, Half Baked. Also from 1997 to 1998, she also had the recurring role of Janet Clemens on The Drew Carey Show. From 1999 to 2000, she appeared in the ABC drama series, Once and Again.

True appeared in a number of independent movies, include With or Without You (1999), The Big Split (1999), and Groove (2000). She starred alongside Monica and Essence Atkins in the 2000 romantic drama film Love Song. From 2002 to 2006, True starred with Essence Atkins in the UPN comedy series, Half & Half, as paternal half-sisters who barely knew each other until becoming adults. She returned to film, playing the supporting role in the 2007 comedy The Perfect Holiday. The following years, she appeared in a number of smaller and made-for-television films, include The Asylum productions Social Nightmare (2013), Blood Lake: Attack of the Killer Lampreys (2014), Sharknado 2: The Second One (2014), and Sharknado: Heart of Sharkness (2015). In 2017, True worked as a tarot-card reader in Echo Park.

True released her book, True Heart Intuitive Tarot, Guidebook And Deck in 2020. She appeared in horror films Agnes and Horror Noire in 2021. The following year, she joined the cast of the second season of Amazon Prime Video comedy series, Harlem. Also that year, True was cast in Half Baked 2, the sequel to the 1998 cult comedy when she reprising her role as Mary Jane Potman.

Filmography

Film

Television

Awards and nominations

References

External links 

Actresses from New York City
American film actresses
American television actresses
African-American actresses
Living people
20th-century American actresses
21st-century American actresses
African-American Jews
20th-century African-American women
20th-century African-American people
21st-century African-American women
21st-century African-American people
American Ashkenazi Jews
1966 births